is the name for the earthly remains of a castle structure in Mihara, Hiroshima, Japan.　Located on a 197.6 meter mountain. The site was designated a National Historic Site.

History

Niitakayama Castle was built in 1552 by Kobayakawa Takakage. Takakage moved Numata Kobayakawa clan's main base from Takayama Castle which located on the mountain across the numata river.

In 1561, Mōri Motonari visited the castle and spent 10 days. In 1596, Takakage moved to Mihara Castle, stones and materials were transferred to Mihara castle at that time.

The castle was listed as one of the Continued 100 Fine Castles of Japan in 2017.

The castle is now only ruins, with some stone walls, moats and wells.

See also
List of Historic Sites of Japan (Hiroshima)

References

Castles in Hiroshima Prefecture
Historic Sites of Japan
Former castles in Japan
Ruined castles in Japan
Mōri clan
1550s establishments in Japan